Huai'an Lianshui International Airport  is an airport serving the city of Huai'an in Jiangsu, China.  It is located in the town of Chenshi in Lianshui County, 22 kilometers northeast of the city center.  Construction of the airport started in October 2008 with a total investment of 800 million yuan, and commercial flights began in September 2010.

In 2011, its first full year of operation, Huai'an Airport handled 230,000 passengers to become the 99th busiest airport in China.

Facilities
The airport has one runway that is 2,800 meters long, and a 14,600 square meter terminal building.  It is designed to handle 1,300,000 passengers and 13,000 tons of cargo annually.  The airport is also used as a pilot training base for China Eastern Airlines.

Airlines and destinations

Huai'an Lianshui International Airport is served by the following airlines:

See also
List of airports in China
List of the busiest airports in China

References

Airports in Jiangsu
Airports established in 2010
2010 establishments in China
Huai'an